Claroline is a collaborative eLearning and eWorking platform (learning management system) released under the GPL open-source license. It allows organizations to create and administer courses and collaboration spaces over the web. The platform is used for educational purposes by schools and universities as well as for data sharing by enterprises. It is available in around 100 countries and 35 different languages.

Tools
The Claroline platform is organized around the concept of spaces associated with courses or pedagogical activities. Each course space provides a list of tools enabling the teacher to:

 Write a course description 
 Publish documents in any format (text, PDF, HTML, video, etc...) 
 Administer public or private forums 
 Create learning paths (compatible with SCORM) 
 Create groups of users 
 Compose exercises (compatible with IMS / QTI standard 2) 
 Structure an agenda with tasks and deadlines 
 Post notifications (also by email) 
 Propose home work to make online 
 View statistics of attendance and completion exercises 
 Use the wiki to write collaborative documents

Development
The Claroline programme was initiated by the University of Louvain in Louvain-la-Neuve, Belgium, at the end of the 1990s. Since 2000, Claroline development teams have been focusing on code stability and the development of features in line with users' needs. The main concern of the developers is not to build up a large number of new features, but to concentrate upon a few elaborated tools concerning the pedagogical approach and the interface offered to the users. A large worldwide community of users and developers also extensively contributes to Claroline's development and diffusion.

Annual Conference of Claroline Users (ACCU)

To promote the use of Claroline and encourage the relationship between contributors, each year, the Claroline community meets at the Annual Conference of Claroline Users (ACCU). 
The ACCU is a unique opportunity to meet users and developers of many countries to share experiences and accomplishment.
The first ACCU was organized the May 22 and 23, 2006 in Louvain-la-Neuve (Belgium), and was also held in other cities such as Vigo (Spain), Lyon (France) and Saidia (Morocco).

Unesco honours Claroline

The Claroline project is the winner of the 2007 UNESCO – King Hamad Bin Isa Al-Khalifa Prize for the Use of ICT in Education. 
The project was chosen from among 68 projects from 51 countries.

Claroline Connect

In addition to the developments related to the maintenance and evolution of the current version of the platform, development teams are working on a new version of Claroline.

Remaining true to the principles of simplicity, flexibility and stability that characterize Claroline, this version, known as code name Claroline Connect, will offer many new features while maintaining some general guidelines:

 User orientation
 Custom profiles
 Independent learning
 Resources modularity and openness to the environment and to changes in the web
 Genericity and variety of learning tools and collaborative work
 Freedom of configuration

Partners
Developed since 2000 by UCLouvain (University of Louvain, Belgium), Claroline has been developed following teacher's pedagogical experience and needs. Claroline is now financially supported by the Walloon Region for its development through the WIST programme.

Within this programme, Claroline associates three Belgian partners :
 IPM, a pedagogy and multimedia research institute at UCLouvain, Louvain-la-Neuve
CERDECAM, the Research and Development Centre of the ECAM engineering school, based at UCLouvain Woluwe campus, Brussels
 LENTIC, research centre on new technologies, innovation and change of the University of Liège, in Liège

Consortium Claroline
The Claroline Consortium was born on May 23, 2007, during the second annual conference of Claroline users that was held at the Vigo University, Spain. This international non-profit association mainly aims at federating the Claroline community, coordinating the platform developments and promoting its use.

The 5 founding members of the Consortium are:

 UCLouvain, Belgium, presiding
 Haute École Léonard de Vinci, Belgium
 Universidade de Vigo, Spain
 Université du Québec à Rimouski, Canada
 Universidad Católica del Norte, Chile

References

External links
 

Free educational software
Free learning management systems
Free software programmed in PHP
Virtual learning environments